Kfar Sirkin or Kefar Syrkin is a moshav in central Israel. Located south-east of Petah Tikva, it falls under the jurisdiction of Drom HaSharon Regional Council.

History
Kfar Sirkin was founded in 1933 and was named for the Zionist leader Nachman Syrkin. It served as a Jewish stronghold during the 1936–1939 Arab revolt in Palestine, with the Haganah using the village to fight off attacking Arab forces and to store weapons which were illegal under the British Mandate rule of the time.

Today, the village is agricultural. An Israel Defense Forces military base, and former RAF airfield, is located to the north-west of the village.

Gallery

References

External links
Moshav website

Moshavim
Populated places in Central District (Israel)
Populated places established in 1933
1933 establishments in Mandatory Palestine